Nagako is an uncommon Japanese given name for females. Although written romanized the same way, the kanji can be different. Notable people with the name include:

, later Empress Kōjun of Japan (香淳皇后)
Nagako Konishi (born 1945), a female composer
Nagako Mori is a snowboarder from Chiba, Japan, specializing in halfpipe riding
Fujiwara no Nagako was a servant of two Japanese tennōs
Nabeshima Nagako was a feature of Japanese high society
Nagako Nagaoka, Japanese religious leader

Japanese feminine given names